Tarik is an album by American jazz saxophonist Dewey Redman featuring performances recorded in 1969 for the French BYG Actuel label.

Reception
The Allmusic review by Scott Yanow awarded the album 4 stars stating "Redman has long been one of the most accessible of the avant-garde players due to his large tone, his willingness to swing hard, and his logical if emotional ideas... This album is well worth searching for".

Track listing
All compositions by Dewey Redman
 "Tarik" - 4:45 
 "Fo Io" - 5:08 
 "Paris? Oui!" - 13:39 
 "Lop-O-Lop" - 13:06 
 "Related and Unrelated Vibrations" - 10:33
Recorded at Studio E.T.A. in Paris, France, on October 1, 1969

Personnel
Dewey Redman - tenor saxophone, musette
Malachi Favors - bass
Ed Blackwell - drums

References

BYG Actuel albums
Dewey Redman albums
1969 albums